Ivan Ivanavich Dzenisevich (born 9 November 1984) is a Belarusian former professional footballer.

Career
Born in Grodno, Dzenisevich began playing football in FC Dinamo Minsk's youth system. He didn't make an appearance for the senior team before moving to FC Darida Minsk Raion where he made his Belarusian Premier League debut in 2004.

In March 2017, Dzenisevich was one of several Isloch Minsk Raion players alleged to be involved in match fixing.

On 20 February 2018, the BFF banned Dzenisevich for 24 months for his involvement in the match fixing.

References

External links

1984 births
Living people
Belarusian footballers
FC Dinamo-Juni Minsk players
FC Neman Grodno players
FC Darida Minsk Raion players
FC Shakhtyor Soligorsk players
FC Gorodeya players
FC Isloch Minsk Raion players
Association football midfielders